Vincent Paul Nihill MBE (5 September 1939 – 15 December 2020) was a British race walker.

Biography
He competed in the 50 km event at the 1964, 1968 and 1972 Olympics, and won a silver medal in 1964. In 1968 he suffered from the high altitude conditions of Mexico and collapsed at the 44th kilometre, which was his only defeat in 86 races between 1967 and 1970. After that he focused on the 20 km distance, and won a European title in this event in 1969, followed by a bronze medal in 1971. In July 1972 he set a world record in the 20 km, but finished only sixth at the 1972 Olympics. He also competed in the 20 km walk in the 1976 Olympics, before retiring the following year.

Nihill became the Member of the Order of the British Empire in 1976. He died at the Maritime Medway Hospital, Gillingham, Kent on 15 December 2020, after contracting COVID-19 amid the COVID-19 pandemic in England.

References

External links 
 

1939 births
2020 deaths
British male racewalkers
English male racewalkers
Olympic athletes of Great Britain
Athletes (track and field) at the 1964 Summer Olympics
Athletes (track and field) at the 1968 Summer Olympics
Athletes (track and field) at the 1972 Summer Olympics
Athletes (track and field) at the 1976 Summer Olympics
Olympic silver medallists for Great Britain
World record setters in athletics (track and field)
Sportspeople from Colchester
European Athletics Championships medalists
Medalists at the 1964 Summer Olympics
Olympic silver medalists in athletics (track and field)
Deaths from the COVID-19 pandemic in England